German submarine U-775 was a Type VIIC U-boat built for Nazi Germany's Kriegsmarine for service during World War II.
She was laid down on 22 January 1943 by Kriegsmarinewerft Wilhelmshaven as yard number 158, launched on 11 February 1944 and commissioned on 23 March 1944 under Oberleutnant zur See Erich Taschenmacher.

Design
German Type VIIC submarines were preceded by the shorter Type VIIB submarines. U-775 had a displacement of  when at the surface and  while submerged. She had two shafts and two  propellers.

U-775 was fitted with five  torpedo tubes (four fitted at the bow and one at the stern), fourteen torpedoes, one  SK C/35 naval gun, (220 rounds), one  Flak M42 and two twin  C/30 anti-aircraft guns. The boat had a complement of between forty-four and sixty.

Service history
The boat's career began with training at 31st U-boat Flotilla on 23 March 1944, followed by active service on 1 November 1944 as part of the 11th Flotilla for the remainder of her service.

Wolfpacks
U-775 took part in no wolfpacks.

Fate
U-775 surrendered on 9 May 1945 in Trondheim, Norway. She was later sunk by gunfire on 8 December 1945 as part of Operation Deadlight.

Summary of raiding history

References

Notes

Citations

Bibliography

External links

German Type VIIC submarines
1944 ships
U-boats commissioned in 1944
U-boats sunk in 1945
Operation Deadlight
World War II shipwrecks in the Atlantic Ocean
World War II submarines of Germany
Ships built in Wilhelmshaven
Maritime incidents in December 1945